Jo-Wilfried Tsonga was the defending champion, but chose not to participate this year.

Gaël Monfils won the title, defeating Vasek Pospisil in the final, 7–5, 6–3.

Seeds
The top four seeds received a bye into the second round.

Draw

Finals

Top half

Bottom half

Qualifying

Seeds

Qualifiers

Qualifying draw

First qualifier

Second qualifier

Third qualifier

Fourth qualifier

References

External links
 Main draw
 Qualifying draw

Singles